Major Sir Cyril Berkeley Ormerod  (3 October 1897 – 1 November 1983) was an English soldier, diplomat and sportsman.

Life and career
Berkeley Ormerod was born in Edmonton, Middlesex, and educated at St Paul's School, London.

He served in World War I, fighting at Arras and Ypres. He ended the war with the rank of major. He joined the London Stock Exchange in 1927 and became a financial columnist.

An opening bowler, he played cricket for Oxfordshire, representing them in a two-day match against the touring Indians in 1932, taking four wickets. He played one first-class cricket match, for Marylebone Cricket Club against Wales at Lord's in 1927. He also played golf; in 1924 he was Army Golf Champion.

In World War II he was financial adviser for British Information Services in New York. He set up the office of Director of Public Relations in New York and occupied the position from 1945. He accompanied Queen Elizabeth and Prince Philip on their visit to the United States in 1957.

He married Beatrice Sigrist, widow of the aircraft designer Frederick Sigrist, at St George's, Hanover Square in 1962. She died in 1981.

Notes

References

External links
Berkeley Ormerod at ESPNcricinfo
Berkeley Ormerod at CricketArchive

1897 births
1983 deaths
English cricketers
People from Edmonton, London
People educated at St Paul's School, London
Marylebone Cricket Club cricketers
Oxfordshire cricketers
Royal Artillery officers
British diplomats
Knights Commander of the Order of the British Empire
British Army personnel of World War I